"Sa Susunod na Habang Buhay" is a song by Filipino folk-pop band Ben&Ben, composed by lead vocalists Paolo Benjamin and Miguel Benjamin Guico. It was released on February 28, 2020.

Release
The standalone single and lyric video were released on Spotify and YouTube respectively on February 28, 2020.

Music video
Released on December 14, 2020, the music video of the song was directed by Jorel Lising, with screenplay from Gaya Sa Pelikula creator Juan Miguel Severo and appearances from Kathryn Bernardo and Daniel Padilla. The appearance of the pair, popularly known as "KathNiel", is considered as a "dream collab" by the band.

Awards and nominations

References and notes
References

Notes

2020 songs
2020 singles
Ben&Ben songs
Tagalog-language songs